John Joseph Mearsheimer (born December 14, 1947) is an American political scientist and international relations scholar, who belongs to the realist school of thought. He is the R. Wendell Harrison Distinguished Service Professor at the University of Chicago. He has been described as the most influential realist of his generation.

Mearsheimer is best known for developing the theory of offensive realism, which describes the interaction between great powers as being primarily driven by the rational desire to achieve regional hegemony in an anarchic international system. In accordance with his theory,  Mearsheimer believes that China's growing power will likely bring it into conflict with the United States.

In his 2007 book The Israel Lobby and U.S. Foreign Policy, Mearsheimer argues that the Israeli lobby wields disproportionate influence over U.S. foreign policy.

Early life
Mearsheimer was born in December 1947 in Brooklyn, New York City. When he was eight, he moved with his family to Croton-on-Hudson, a suburb in Westchester County. When he was 17, Mearsheimer enlisted in the U.S. Army. After one year as an enlisted member, he obtained an appointment to the U.S. Military Academy at West Point, which he attended from 1966 to 1970. After graduation, he served for five years as an officer in the U.S. Air Force.

In 1974, while he was in the Air Force, Mearsheimer earned a master's degree in international relations from the University of Southern California. He entered Cornell University and in 1980 earned a PhD in government, specifically in international relations. From 1978 to 1979, he was a research fellow at the Brookings Institution in Washington, DC. From 1980 to 1982, he was a postdoctoral fellow at Harvard University's Center for International Affairs. During the 1998–1999 academic year, he was the Whitney H. Shepardson Fellow at the Council on Foreign Relations in New York.

Career
Since 1982, Mearsheimer has been a member of the faculty of the Department of Political Science Faculty at the University of Chicago. He became an associate professor in 1984 and a full professor in 1987 and was appointed the R. Wendell Harrison Distinguished Service Professor in 1996. From 1989 to 1992, he served as chairman of the department. He also holds a position as a faculty member in the Committee on International Relations graduate program, and he is a co-director of the Program on International Security Policy.

Mearsheimer's books include Conventional Deterrence (1983), which won the Edgar S. Furniss Jr. Book Award; Nuclear Deterrence: Ethics and Strategy (co-editor, 1985); Liddell Hart and the Weight of History (1988); The Tragedy of Great Power Politics (2001), which won the Lepgold Book Prize; The Israel Lobby and U.S. Foreign Policy (2007); and Why Leaders Lie: The Truth About Lying in International Politics (2011). His articles have appeared in academic journals like International Security and popular magazines like the London Review of Books. He has written op-ed pieces for The New York Times, the Los Angeles Times, and the Chicago Tribune.

Mearsheimer has won several teaching awards. He received the Clark Award for Distinguished Teaching when he was a graduate student at Cornell in 1977, and he won the Quantrell Award for Excellence in Undergraduate Teaching at the University of Chicago in 1985. In addition, he was selected as a Phi Beta Kappa Visiting Scholar for the 1993–1994 academic year. In that capacity, he gave a series of talks at eight colleges and universities. In 2003, he was elected to the American Academy of Arts and Sciences. He is the recipient of the American Political Science Association's 2020 James Madison Award, which is presented every three years to an American political scientist who has made distinguished scholarly contributions. The Award Committee noted that Mearsheimer is "one of the most cited International Relations scholars in the discipline, but his works are read well beyond the academy as well."

Mearsheimer's works are widely read and debated by 21st century students of international relations. A 2017 survey of U.S. international relations faculty ranks him third among "scholars whose work has had the greatest influence on the field of IR in the past 20 years."

Work

Conventional deterrence
Mearsheimer's first book, Conventional Deterrence (1983), addresses the issue of how the decision to start a war depends on the projected outcome of the war, in other words, how the decision makers' beliefs about the outcome of the war affect the success or failure of deterrence. Mearsheimer's basic argument is that deterrence is likely to work when the potential attacker believes that an attack will be costly and is unlikely to succeed. However, if the potential attacker has reason to believe the attack will entail low costs and is likely to succeed, deterrence is likely to break down, which is now widely accepted to be how the principle of deterrence works. Specifically, Mearsheimer argues that the success of deterrence is determined by the strategy available to the potential attacker. He lays out three strategies.

Firstly, an attrition strategy entails a high level of uncertainty about the outcome of war and high costs for the attacker. Secondly, a limited-aims strategy entails fewer risks and lower costs. Thirdly, a blitzkrieg strategy provides a way to defeat the enemy rapidly and decisively with relatively low costs. For Mearsheimer, failures in the modern battlefield are caused mostly by the potential attacker's belief that it can successfully implement a blitzkrieg strategy in which tanks and other mechanized forces are employed swiftly to cause deep penetration and to disrupt the enemy's rear. The two other strategies are unlikely to lead to deterrence failures because they entail a low probability of success, accompanied by high costs (war of attrition) or limited gains and the possibility of the conflict turning into a war of attrition (limited aims). However, if the attacker has a coherent blitzkrieg strategy available, an attack is likely to ensue because its potential benefits outweigh the costs and risks of starting a war.

Besides analyzing cases from World War II and the Arab–Israeli conflict, Mearsheimer's 1983 book extrapolates implications from his theory for the prospects of conventional deterrence in Central Europe during the late Cold War. It argues that a Soviet attack is unlikely because the Soviet military would be unable to successfully implement a blitzkrieg strategy. The book argues that the balance of forces, the difficulty of advancing rapidly with mechanized forces through Central Europe, and the formidable NATO forces opposing such a Soviet attack results in low chances for the Soviets to start a conventional war in Europe.

B. H. Liddell Hart 
Mearsheimer's second book, Liddell Hart and the Weight of History (1988), reassesses the intellectual legacies of the 20th century British military theorist B. H. Liddell Hart. While acknowledging that his own research had "profited greatly from his stimulating writings" and that Liddell Hart's works should still be considered "essential reading for serious students of strategy and warfare" (p. x), Mearsheimer argues that much of the conventional wisdom on Liddell Hart's contributions to modern military thought was flawed. In particular, the theory of the indirect approach, which Liddell Hart developed in the 1930s, is so vague and tautological that "virtually every military victory can be ascribed to [it]." (p. 87). Moreover, Liddell Hart's limited attempts to operationalize the theory clearly indicated that what he primarily had in mind was to "indirectly" defeat a continental adversary by "break[ing] the morale of the enemy's civilian population, not to destroy his military forces, which of course is what the blitzkrieg is concerned with" (p. 88). The common practice of tracing the intellectual origins of the blitzkrieg strategy to the indirect approach is thus mistaken since there was "no evidence... that Liddell Hart understood the importance of the deep strategic penetration [that distinguishes blitzkrieg] before World War II" (p. 43). Not surprisingly, Liddell Hart was proven utterly wrong on the fundamental military questions of the interwar period (he dismissed the possibility of a decisive German offensive in the Western front) and fell into disrepute in the immediate aftermath of the war.

Mearsheimer shows that Liddell Hart managed to salvage his intellectual stature by convincing former Wehrmacht generals to credit him with the ideas that led to the development of Germany's blitzkrieg strategy. Eager to restore their own tarnished reputation after the war, retired German generals such as Heinz Guderian allowed Liddell Hart to exaggerate his influence on blitzkrieg in their memoirs in exchange for helping them promote an image of themselves as having been military innovators first and foremost rather than Nazi henchmen. In the case of Guderian, Liddell Hart effectively acted as his "literary agent" for the English-speaking world (p. 185). Fritz Bayerlein, who served as General Erwin Rommel's chief of staff in the North African campaign, similarly helped Liddell Hart manipulate the historical record for a false portrayal of Rommel as having been his "pupil" (pp. 193–201). Mearsheimer concludes by emphasizing the importance of a robust intellectual community that can hold "defense intellectuals" accountable: Defense intellectuals need to know that informed judgments will be passed on their views and their overall conduct and that charlatanism will be exposed. Absence of penalties for misbehavior means no brake on the spread of false ideas. Liddell Hart actually was held accountable at one point. The significant ebbing of his influence during and immediately after World War II was, in effect, punishment for offering flawed ideas for how to deal with the Third Reich. What is disturbing about Liddell Hart's case, however, is that eventually he was able to escape from this predicament by rewriting history. The national security community, especially its historians, need to be alert to historical manipulation for selfish reasons (p. 224).Mearsheimer's arguments about Liddell Hart generated varied responses. For example, the founder of the Israel Defense Forces Operational Theory Research Institute, Simon Naveh, concurred in a separate study, which found that "by distorting the actual historical circumstances of the Blitzkrieg formation [Liddell Hart] obscured its temporal and cognitive origins.... The early-1950s display of the transformed version of Blitzkrieg as a historical fact, carrying the joint signature of Liddell Hart and Guderian, lent it an authentic touch and a professional legitimacy that could not be shaken." In contrast, Richard Swain of the U.S. Army Command and General Staff College argued that while "there is a good deal about which Mearsheimer is correct," he likely overstates the extent to which Liddell Hart's historical distortions were consciously self-serving: "To charge Liddell Hart with cleverly creating a deception requires one first to accept that Liddell Hart knew he had been wrong. There is little or no evidence of that."

Nuclear proliferation and deterrence

In 1990, Mearsheimer published an essay in which he predicted that Europe would revert to a multipolar environment, similar to that of the first half of the 20th century, if American and Soviet forces left after the end of the Cold War. In another article that year in The Atlantic, he predicted that the multipolar environment would increase nuclear proliferation in Europe, especially in Germany.

In that essay and in the 1993 Foreign Affairs article "The case for a Ukrainian nuclear deterrent", he argues that to reduce the dangers of war, the U.S. should accept the possibility of Germany and Ukraine developing a nuclear arsenal and work to prevent the rise of excessive nationalism. Mearsheimer presents several possible scenarios for a Europe after the departure of American and Russian forces. He states that a Europe with nuclear proliferation was most likely to remain at peace because without a nuclear deterrent, Germany would be likely to once more try to conquer the continent. Mearsheimer argues it to be strategically unwise for Ukraine to surrender its nuclear arsenal (remnants of the Soviet stockpile). However, in 1994 a series of agreements required Ukraine to agree to get rid of its entire former Soviet nuclear stockpile, a process that was complete by 1996.

When challenged on the former assertion at a lecture given to the International Politics department at the University of Wales in Aberystwyth, he maintained that in spite of European integration and expansion, he still believed that his predictions would come true if the US military left Europe.

Also, in op-ed pieces written in 1998 and 2000 for The New York Times, Mearsheimer explains why it makes sense for India to pursue nuclear weapons. He argues that India has good strategic reasons to want a nuclear deterrent, especially to balance against China and Pakistan and to guarantee regional stability. He also criticized the American counterproliferation policy towards India, which he considers to be unrealistic and harmful to American interests in the region.

International institutions 
In a widely cited 1994 article, "The False Promise of International Institutions," Mearsheimer tackles popular arguments about the ability of institutions to discourage war and promote peace among states. He recognizes that states often find institutions to be useful, but the imperative of relentless security competition under anarchy means that state behavior is primarily a function of the distribution of power in the international system. Institutions, at best, are "merely an intervening variable in the process" (p. 13). Mearsheimer maintains that "institutionalist theories" offered poor alternatives to this grim picture of international politics. In particular, influential neoliberal institutionalist arguments ignore relative-gains concerns as a barrier to cooperation and fail to provide evidence that instances of cooperation, which are commonly attributed to institutions, would not have taken place in their absence. Other theories such as collective security theory and critical theory likewise fell short on logical and empirical grounds.

In a response article, the prominent neoliberal institutionalist scholars Robert Keohane and Lisa Martin acknowledge that seminal institutionalist works tended to neglect the problem of relative gains but maintain that the debate spawned by realist challenges "has made distributional and bargaining issues more salient than they were in early neoliberal thinking" (p. 45). Mearsheimer charges that "a careful look at Keohane and Martin's response reveals that liberal institutionalism in its latest form is no longer a clear alternative to realism, but has, in fact, been swallowed up by it."

Offensive realism
Mearsheimer is the leading proponent of offensive realism. The structural theory, unlike the classical realism of Hans Morgenthau, places the principal emphasis on security competition among great powers within the anarchy of the international system, not on the human nature of statesmen and diplomats. In contrast to another structural realist theory, the defensive realism of Kenneth Waltz, offensive realism maintains that states are not satisfied with a given amount of power but seek hegemony for security because the anarchic makeup of the international system creates strong incentives for states to seek opportunities to gain power at the expense of competitors. Mearsheimer summarized that view in his 2001 book The Tragedy of Great Power Politics:

Given the difficulty of determining how much power is enough for today and tomorrow, great powers recognize that the best way to ensure their security is to achieve hegemony now, thus eliminating any possibility of a challenge by another great power. Only a misguided state would pass up an opportunity to be the hegemon in the system because it thought it already had sufficient power to survive.

He also dismisses democratic peace theory, which claims that democracies never or rarely go to war with each other.

Mearsheimer does not believe it to be possible for a state to become a global hegemon (see section on Night watchman below). Although that is theoretically possible, there is too much landmass and too many oceans, which he posits as having effective stopping power and acting as giant moats. Instead, he believes that states can achieve only regional hegemony. Furthermore, he argues that regional hegemons attempt to prevent other states from gaining hegemony in their region since peer competitors would be free to roam and thus could interfere in the established regional hegemon's neighborhood. States that have achieved regional hegemony, such as the United States, will act as offshore balancers by interfering in other regions if the great powers in those regions cannot prevent the rise of a hegemon.

Endorsement of E. H. Carr
In a 2004 speech, Mearsheimer praised the British historian E. H. Carr for his 1939 book The Twenty Years' Crisis and argued that Carr was correct when he claimed that international relations were a struggle of all against all, with states always placing their own interests first. Mearsheimer maintained that Carr's points were still as relevant for 2004 as for 1939 and went on to deplore what he claimed was the dominance of "idealist" thinking about international relations in British academic life.

Night watchman
Night watchman in Mearsheimer's terminology is a "global hegemon", a theoretical impossibility according to The Tragedy of Great Power Politics. Nevertheless, in 1990, Mearsheimer mentioned the existence of a "watchman". Democracies lived at peace because "America's hegemonic position in NATO ... mitigated the effects of anarchy on the Western democracies and induced cooperation among them ... With the United States serving as a night watchman (emphasis added), fears about relative gains among the Western European states were mitigated ..."

Afterwards, Mearsheimer did not mention the "watchman" for some time. A decade later, he described the "international anarchy" as having not changed with the end of the Cold War, "... and there are few signs that such change is likely any time soon. States remain the principal actors in world politics and there is still no night watchman standing above them." Five more years later, Mearsheimer confirmed that "in an anarchic system there is no night watchman for a state to call when trouble comes knocking at their door."

Precisely two decades after Mearsheimer had detected the watchman in the world for the last time, he rediscovered the watchman, which exists and keeps Europe at peace. The article "Why Is Europe Peaceful Today?" unambiguously answers, "The reason is simple: the United States is by far the most powerful country in the world and it effectively acts as a night watchman."

Gulf War
In January and early February 1991, Mearsheimer published two op-eds in the Chicago Tribune and the New York Times and argued that the war to liberate Kuwait from Iraqi forces would be quick and lead to a decisive U.S. victory, with less than 1,000 American casualties. Mearsheimer's argument was based on several points.

Firstly, the Iraqi Army was a Third World military that was unprepared to fight mobile armored battles. Secondly, U.S. armored forces were better equipped and trained. Thirdly, U.S. artillery was also far better than its Iraqi counterpart. Fourthly, U.S. airpower, unfettered by the weak Iraqi air force, should prove devastating against Iraqi ground forces. Fifthly and finally, the forward deployment of Iraqi reserves boded ill for their ability to counter U.S. efforts to penetrate the Iraqi defense line along the Saudi–Kuwaiti border. All of those predictions came true during the course of the war.

Noelle-Neumann controversy
In October 1991, Mearsheimer was drawn into a bitter controversy at the University of Chicago regarding Elisabeth Noelle-Neumann, then a visiting professor from Germany. Noelle-Neumann was a prominent German pollster and a leading academic on public opinion research, who authored the highly regarded book, The Spiral of Silence.  The debate centered on an article written for Commentary magazine by Leo Bogart, "The Pollster and the Nazis," which described Noelle-Neumann's past employment as a writer and editor for the Nazi newspaper Das Reich from 1940 to 1942. Noelle-Neumann's response to the article was to claim that "texts written under a dictatorship more than 50 years ago cannot be read as they were in 1937, 1939 or 1941. Severed from the time and place where they were written, they are no longer real, for reality is in part based on time and place."

As chairman of Chicago's political science department at the time, Mearsheimer sat down with Noelle-Neumann to discuss the article and the allegations. After meeting with her for over three hours, Mearsheimer publicly declared, "I believe that Noelle-Neumann was an anti-Semite," and he spearheaded a campaign to ask her for an apology. He joined other University of Chicago faculty in writing a joint piece for Commentary that reacted to Noelle-Neumann's reply to the accusation against her. They declared that "by providing rhetorical support for the exclusion of Jews, her words helped make the disreputable reputable, the indecent decent, the uncivilized civilized, and the unthinkable thinkable." Mearsheimer said, "Knowing what we know now about the Holocaust, there is no reason for her not to apologize. To ask somebody who played a contributing role in the greatest crime of the 20th century to say 'I'm sorry' is not unreasonable."

The Israel Lobby and U.S. Foreign Policy

In March 2006, Mearsheimer and Stephen Walt, the former academic dean and professor of international relations at the Harvard Kennedy School, published a working paper and a London Review of Books article discussing the power of the "Israel lobby" in shaping U.S. foreign policy. They define the Israel lobby as "a loose coalition of individuals and organizations who actively work to steer US foreign policy in a pro-Israel direction." They state that it is not appropriate to label it a "Jewish lobby" because not all Jews feel a strong attachment to Israel, and because some of the individuals and groups who work to foster U.S. support for Israel are not Jewish. According to Mearsheimer and Walt, Christian Zionists also play an important role. Finally, they emphasize that the lobby is not a cabal or a conspiracy but simply a powerful interest group, like the National Rifle Association or the farm lobby. Their core argument is that the policies pushed by the lobby are not in the national interest of the US or ultimately of Israel. Those pieces generated extensive media coverage and led to a wide-ranging and often heated debate, including charges of antisemitism, between supporters and opponents of their argument. The article was subsequently turned into a book, The Israel Lobby and U.S. Foreign Policy.

Statements on Israeli wars and Palestinian statehood
Mearsheimer was critical of the 2006 Lebanon War. He argued that Israel's strategy was "doomed to fail" because it was based on the "faulty assumption" that Israeli air power could defeat Hezbollah, which was essentially a guerrilla force. The war, he argued, was a disaster for the Lebanese people, as well as a "major setback" for the United States and Israel. He said that the Israel lobby played a key role in enabling Israel's counterproductive response by preventing the US from exercising independent influence.

Mearsheimer was also critical of Israel's offensive against Hamas in the Gaza Strip that began in December 2008. He argued that it would not eliminate Hamas's capability to fire missiles and rockets at Israel and that it would not cause Hamas to end its fight with Israel. In fact, he argued that relations between Israel and the Palestinians were likely to get worse in the years ahead.

Mearsheimer emphasizes that the only hope for Israel to end its conflict with the Palestinians is to end the occupation and to allow the Palestinians to have their own state in Gaza and the West Bank. Otherwise, Israel will turn itself into an "apartheid state". That would be a disastrous outcome for Israel but also the United States and especially the Palestinians.

Mearsheimer's criticisms of Israel further extended to its possession of nuclear weapons. In remarks made at the International Spy Museum in 2010, Mearsheimer asserted that a nuclear Israel was contrary to U.S. interests and questioned Israel's accountability in the matter. He stated that there was "no accountability for Israel on any issue" because he surmised, "The Israelis can do almost anything and get away with it."

"Future of Palestine" lecture
In April 2010, Mearsheimer delivered the Hisham B. Sharabi Memorial Lecture at the Palestine Center in Washington, D.C., which he titled "The Future of Palestine: Righteous Jews vs. the New Afrikaners." He argued that "the two-state solution is now a fantasy" because Israel will incorporate the Gaza Strip and the West Bank into a "Greater Israel", which would become an apartheid state. According to Mearsheimer, such a state would not be politically viable, most American Jews would not support it, and it would eventually become a democratic binational state politically dominated by its Palestinian majority. He suggested that "American Jews who care deeply about Israel" could be divided into three categories: the "new Afrikaners", who will support Israel even if it is an apartheid state; "righteous Jews", who believe that individual rights are universal and apply equally to Jews and Palestinians; and the largest group, which he called the "great ambivalent middle". He concluded that most of the "great ambivalent middle" would not defend an apartheid Israel because "American Jews are among the staunchest defenders of traditional liberal values." Accordingly, the "new Afrikaners" would become increasingly marginalized over time. Mearsheimer stated that he "would classify most of the individuals who head the Israel lobby's major organizations as "'new Afrikaners'" and specifically listed a number of prominent Jews and Jewish organizations, including Abraham Foxman of the Anti-Defamation League, David Harris of the American Jewish Committee, Malcolm Hoenlein of the Conference of Presidents of Major American Jewish Organizations, Ronald Lauder of the World Jewish Congress, Morton Klein of the Zionist Organization of America, as well as businessmen such as Sheldon Adelson, Lester Crown, and Mortimer Zuckerman and "media personalities" like Fred Hiatt, Charles Krauthammer, Bret Stephens, and Martin Peretz.

Allegations of antisemitism
In 2011, John Mearsheimer wrote a back-cover blurb for controversial author Gilad Atzmon's book The Wandering Who? A Study of Jewish Identity Politics: "Gilad Atzmon has written a fascinating and provocative book on Jewish identity in the modern world. He shows how assimilation and liberalism are making it increasingly difficult for Jews in the Diaspora to maintain a powerful sense of their 'Jewishness.' Panicked Jewish leaders, he argues, have turned to Zionism (blind loyalty to Israel) and scaremongering (the threat of another Holocaust) to keep the tribe united and distinct from the surrounding goyim. As Atzmon's own case demonstrates, this strategy is not working and is causing many Jews great anguish. The Wandering Who? should be widely read by Jews and non-Jews alike."

Mearsheimer's endorsement of Atzmon's book was met with accusations of antisemitism by prominent Jewish writers and intellectuals. Alan Dershowitz wrote an article in response, "Why are John Mearsheimer and Richard Falk Endorsing a Blatantly Anti-Semitic Book?" It stated that the book "argues that Jews seek to control the world."

Mearsheimer denied the charges of antisemitism in that he had "no reason to amend it or embellish" his blurb and defended his position. Writing in regard to the charge by Goldberg that Atzmon is antisemitic and, by implication, so is his positive review of Atzmon's book, Mearsheimer responded: "Atzmon's basic point is that Jews often talk in universalistic terms, but many of them think and act in particularistic terms. One might say they talk like liberals but act like nationalists.... It is in this context that he discusses what he calls the 'Holocaust religion,' Zionism, and Israel's treatment of the Palestinians. Again, to be perfectly clear, he has no animus toward Judaism as a religion or with individuals who are Jewish by birth."

Rise and containment of China
Mearsheimer asserts that China's rise will not be peaceful and that the US will seek to contain China and to prevent it from achieving regional hegemony. Mearsheimer argues that although containing China militarily is possible, economic containment of China is not. Mearsheimer believes that China will attempt to dominate the Indo-Pacific region just as the U.S. set out to dominate the Western Hemisphere. China's goal will be to gain a position of military superiority over its neighbors, which it sees as potentially dangerous threats. Additionally, he maintains that the U.S. will attempt to form a balancing coalition that consists primarily of India, Japan, the Philippines, South Korea, Vietnam, and Indonesia to counter the growing strength and power projection capabilities of China.

Mearsheimer presented a fuller statement of his views on China's rise in his 2014 updated edition of The Tragedy of Great Power Politics, arguing that "if China continues its striking economic growth over the next few decades, it is likely to act in accordance with the logic of offensive realism.... Specifically, it will try to dominate Asia the way the United States dominates the Western Hemisphere." In accordance with the theory's structural logic, China will pursue regional hegemony not because its domestic politics or ideology inclines it toward aggression but because "domination offers the best way to survive under international anarchy" (p. 368). Mearsheimer stressed that China was simply following America's example in that regard:These ambitious goals make good strategic sense for China (although this is not to say China will necessarily be able to achieve them). Beijing should want a militarily weak and isolated India, Japan, and Russia as its neighbors, just as the United States prefers a militarily weak Canada and Mexico on its borders. What state in its right mind would want other powerful countries located in its region? All Chinese surely remember what happened over the last century when Japan was powerful and China was weak.... [They also] surely remember what happened in the hundred years between the First Opium War (1832–42) and the end of World War II (1945), when the United States and the European great powers took advantage of a weak China and not only violated its sovereignty but also imposed unfair treaties on it and exploited it economically. Why should we expect China to act differently than the United States? Are the Chinese more principled than we are? More ethical? Are they less nationalistic? Less concerned about their survival? They are none of these things, of course, which is why China is likely to follow basic realist logic and attempt to become a regional hegemon in Asia (pp. 374-375).

In a subsequent debate with former U.S. National Security Advisor Zbigniew Brzezinski in Foreign Policy magazine, Mearsheimer clarified, "It is unlikely that China will go on a rampage and conquer other Asian countries. Instead, China will want to dictate the boundaries of acceptable behavior to neighboring countries, much the way the United States does in the Americas. An increasingly powerful China is also likely to try to push the United States out of Asia, much the way the United States pushed the European great powers out of the Western Hemisphere." In his response, Brzezinski argued, "How great powers behave is not predetermined.... For its part, the Chinese leadership appears much more flexible and sophisticated than many previous aspirants to great power status." Mearsheimer responded that Chinese leaders are indeed prudent and have no incentive to "pick a fight" with the United States at the moment, but "what we are talking about is the situation in 2025 or 2030, when China has the military muscle to take on the United States. What happens then, when China has a much larger gross national product and a much more formidable military than it has today? The history of great powers offers a straightforward answer[.]"

In a widely debated 2021 Foreign Affairs article, Mearsheimer observed that the United States was destined to compete aggressively with China as long as the latter continued to grow into a militarily and economically powerful state in East Asia. However, contrary to realist logic, the U.S. in the post-Cold War period had "promoted investment in China and welcomed the country into the global trading system, thinking it would become a peace-loving democracy and a responsible stakeholder in a U.S.-led international order" (p. 48). In effect, by pursuing a policy of engagement, the U.S. had facilitated China's dangerous rise to great-power status and hastened the onset of a new Cold War:Nobody can say that engagement wasn't given ample opportunity to work, nor can anyone argue that China emerged as a threat because the United States was not accommodating enough....China's economy experienced unprecedented growth, but the country did not turn into a liberal democracy or a responsible stakeholder. To the contrary, Chinese leaders view liberal values as a threat to their country's stability, and as rulers of rising powers normally do, they are pursuing an increasingly aggressive foreign policy. There is no way around it: engagement was a colossal strategic mistake (pp. 54-55).In a 2015 review of Mearsheimer's arguments on China, the sociologist Amitai Etzioni charged that China and the U.S. "have very little 'real' reason to confront each other" and that the "main value of Mearsheimer's provocative thesis is that it alerts those of us on both sides of the power divide to redouble our efforts to prevent his dire predictions from coming true." By contrast, Executive Director Tom Switzer of the Sydney-based Centre for Independent Studies opined in May 2020, "Rarely in history has an academic been as intellectually vindicated as John Mearsheimer, [He] accurately foresaw the intense Sino-American security competition that the coronavirus crisis has exposed."

Why Leaders Lie

Mearsheimer wrote a book, Why Leaders Lie (Oxford University Press, 2011), which analyzes lying in international politics. He argues that leaders lie to foreign audiences because they think that it is good for their country. For example, he maintains that U.S. President Franklin D. Roosevelt lied about the Greer incident in September 1941 because he was deeply committed to getting America into World War II, which he thought was in its national interest.

His two main findings are that leaders actually do not lie very much to other countries and that democratic leaders are actually more likely than autocrats to lie to their own people. Thus, he starts his book by saying that it is not surprising that Saddam Hussein did not lie about Iraq having no weapons of mass destruction but that George W. Bush and some of his key advisors lied to the American people about the threat from Iraq. Mearsheimer argues that leaders are most likely to lie to their own people in democracies that fight wars of choice in distant places. He says that it is difficult for leaders to lie to other countries because there is not much trust among them, especially when security issues are at stake, and trust is needed for lying to be effective. Mearsheimer states that it is easier for leaders to lie to their own people because there is usually a good deal of trust between them.

Mearsheimer does not consider the moral dimension of international lying, which he views from a utilitarian perspective. He argues that there are five types of international lies.
 Inter-state lies occur if the leader of one country lies to a leader of another country or, more generally, any foreign audience, to induce a desired reaction.
 Fear-mongering occurs if a leader lies to his or her own domestic public.
 Strategic cover-ups are lies to prevent controversial policies and deals from being made known publicly.
 Nationalist myths are stories about a country's past that portray that country in a positive light and its adversaries in a negative light.
 Liberal lies are given to clear up the negative reputation of institutions, individuals, or actions.

He explains the reasons for leaders pursuing each of the different kinds of lies. His central thesis is that leaders lie more frequently to domestic audiences than to leaders of other states. That is because international lying can have negative effects, including "blowback" and "backfiring".

Blowback occurs if telling international lies helps cause a culture of deceit at home. Backfiring occurs if telling a lie leads to a failed policy. He also emphasizes that there are two other kinds of deception besides lying: "concealment", a leader remaining silent about an important matter, and "spinning", a leader telling a story that emphasizes the positive and downplays or ignores the negative.

Liberal international order
In The Great Delusion: Liberal Dreams and International Realities (Yale University Press, 2018) Mearsheimer presents a critique of the geopolitical strategy he refers to as "liberal hegemony". His definition of liberal hegemony includes a three-part designation of it as an extension of Woodrow Wilson's original initiatives to make the world safe by turning its governments into democracies, turning geopolitical economic initiatives towards open markets compatible with democratic governments, and opening up and promoting other democratically liberal international social and culture societies on a global scale of inclusion. Mearsheimer stated in an interview broadcast on C-SPAN that liberal hegemony represents a "great delusion" and that much more weight should be associated with nationalism as a policy of enduring geopolitical value than the delusions he associated with liberal hegemony.

In a related 2019 article, Mearsheimer argued that the U.S.-led liberal international order had been destined to collapse from its inception. Contrary to scholars such as John Ikenberry, who trace the origins of the liberal international order to the early Cold War, he asserted that the Cold War liberal order had in fact been a "bounded order", designed to help the United States and its allies compete more effectively against the communist bloc. Although the U.S.-led order became truly international after the collapse of the Soviet Union, the policies that undergird the order tended to precipitate its demise to the point that "[e]ven if Western policymakers had been wiser stewards of that order, they could not have extended its longevity in any meaningful way" (p. 30). In particular, U.S.-led efforts to expand the order's membership by spreading democracy were bound to backfire by provoking nationalist resistance, embroiling the U.S. in disastrous military adventures, and stoking hostility among rival powers such as Russia and China. Liberal internationalist policies also tended to collide with nationalism and economic concerns within the liberal countries themselves, as illustrated by key events such as Brexit and the election of Donald Trump to the U.S. presidency. Finally, the drive to integrate rising powers such as China into the liberal international order effectively "helped China become a great power, thus undercutting unipolarity, which is essential for maintaining a liberal world order" (p. 42).

Mearsheimer concluded by predicting that the liberal international order would be replaced by three distinct "realist orders" in the near term: "a thin international order", primarily concerned with arms control and managing the global economy, and two bounded orders, led respectively by China and the United States (p. 44).

His claims about the liberal international order have sparked a lively debate and prompted responses from scholars such as Robert Jervis, Christopher Layne, Jennifer Pitts, Jack Snyder, William C. Wohlforth, and C. William Walldorf. In a critique of The Great Delusion, Wohlforth writes that the book fails to make good on its core claim: "First, you cannot establish a causal connection between liberalism and imprudent foreign policy by looking at only liberalism and imprudent foreign policy. Because Mearsheimer subjects no other ideology to the same scrutiny to which he subjects liberalism, there is no way to know whether liberalism stands out this regard.... Second, you cannot establish that a permissive systemic environment is a necessary condition by looking only at cases that occur in a permissive strategic environment." Wohlforth also argues that The Great Delusion is inconsistent with Mearsheimer's Tragedy of Great Power Politics: "Given that other great powers were destined to come back, and the theory’s stipulation that their preferences (i.e., revisionism) are independent of anything the U.S. does (because nothing the U.S. does can reduce their uncertainty about U.S. intentions, and vice-versa), why would a unipolar U.S. not seek to expand and lock in gains when it had the opportunity to do so?"

Mearsheimer makes important reference to Laurence Lampert's nihilistic Strauss interpretation in his book "The Great Delusion".

Ukraine

Nuclear weapons and Ukraine

After the end of the Soviet Union, the newly independent Ukraine had a large arsenal of nuclear weapons on its territory. However, in 1994, Ukraine agreed to give up nuclear arms and become a member of the Nuclear Nonproliferation Treaty; within two years, it had removed all atomic weapons. Almost alone among observers, Mearsheimer was opposed to that decision because he saw that Ukraine without a nuclear deterrent would likely be subjected to aggression by Russia. As early as 1993, he suggested that Ukraine should retain its nuclear weapons as a deterrent.

2014 Crimean crisis
Mearsheimer had warned in 1993 that a nuclear-free Ukraine would remain exposed to the danger of Russian attempts at reconquest. In 2014, he retrospectively criticized the geopolitical reorientation of the United States under Bill Clinton since 1995 due to its monopolistic and hegemonic orientation. With the intention of weakening the government of Russia, he said, NATO was planned to be extended to Russia's borders. Accordingly, in an article in Foreign Affairs in August 2014, he assigned the main blame for the outbreak of the conflict to the United States and its Western allies.

Since the mid-1990s, Russian leaders have adamantly opposed NATO enlargement, and in recent years, they have made it clear that they would not stand by while their strategically important neighbor turned into a Western bastion. For Putin, the illegal overthrow of Ukraine’s democratically elected and pro-Russian president—which he rightly labeled a "coup"—was the final straw. He responded by taking Crimea, a peninsula he feared would host a NATO naval base, and working to destabilize Ukraine until it abandoned its efforts to join the West. 

Mearsheimer thinks that those who believe that Russia has only been waiting for opportunities to annex Ukraine are mistaken. 

The U.S. and European political elites had been caught unprepared by the events "because they attach little importance to the logic of realism in the 21st century and assume that European unity and freedom can be guaranteed by means of liberal principles such as the rule of law, economic interdependence, and democracy."

Mearsheimer also thinks that in spite of being aware of Russia's rejectionist stance, a stance which is understandable given Russia's security interests, the U.S. would have pushed for the eastward expansion of the EU and NATO and supported the democratization of Ukraine anyway. Mearsheimer considers Putin's reaction understandable because Ukraine (as a non-aligned state) is "indispensable" as a buffer for Russia's security needs.  Mearsheimer compared NATO expansion into Eastern Europe, led by NATO, and the planned inclusion of Ukraine into that alliance to a hypothetical scenario of there being a Chinese military alliance that planned to include countries in North America: "Imagine the American outrage if China built an impressive military alliance and tried to include Canada and Mexico."

Mearsheimer argued in a piece for Foreign Affairs that Russia's annexation of the Crimea was fueled by concerns that it would lose access to its Black Sea Fleet naval base at Sevastopol if Ukraine continued to move towards NATO and European integration. Mearsheimer concluded that US policy should shift to recognize Ukraine as a buffer state between NATO and Russia, rather than attempt to absorb Ukraine into NATO. Mearsheimer's article provoked Michael McFaul and Stephen Sestanovich to publish their response in the November/December 2014 issue of Foreign Affairs.

Mearsheimer sees NATO's eastward expansion as a dangerous provocation of Russia. He invokes George F. Kennan as one of the first critical admonishers who warned in 1998 of the danger of war as a result of eastward enlargement. Mearsheimer attributes the political mistakes to the lack of political realism or the great influence of the "liberal hegemony" school of thought in both the Democratic Party and the Republican Party. The only sensible way out of the crisis, he said, is to soberly factor in Russia's security interests, like those of any other power. Ukraine, he said, must accept the role of buffer or bridge given to it by its geostrategic situation. Anything else, he said, was abstract and meaningless in terms of Realpolitik. The West's constructive cooperation with Russia is of great importance for solving important existing and upcoming problems and should not be put at risk, he said. In response to the Brookings Institution's 2015 recommendation to provide weapons to Ukraine to increase the cost of an attack to Putin, Mearsheimer replied in The New York Times that the strategic importance is so great to Russia that it will continue the conflict at any cost, up to and including the use of nuclear weapons. Former U.S. Ambassador to Russia Michael McFaul counterargued in his Foreign Affairs response piece, that in 2014, Russian foreign policy was not a reaction to the United States, but was based on the internal Russian dynamics.

2022 Russian invasion of Ukraine
In his 25 September 2015 lecture "Why Is Ukraine the West's Fault?", Mearsheimer stated that the West (the United States and the European Union) was leading Ukraine down the primrose path, that the Western powers were encouraging Ukraine to become part of the West despite their hesitancy to integrate Ukraine into NATO and the EU, that they were encouraging the Ukrainian government to pursue a hardline policy towards Russia, and that "the end result is that Ukraine is going to get wrecked." In the same lecture Mearsheimer declared: "If you really want to wreck Russia, what you should do is to encourage it to try to conquer Ukraine. Putin is much too smart to try that."

Following the 2022 Russian invasion of Ukraine, Mearsheimer reiterated that NATO and the EU were largely to blame for the war in Ukraine. In an interview with The New Yorker, Mearsheimer stated: "I think all the trouble in this case really started in April 2008, at the NATO Summit in Bucharest, where afterward NATO issued a statement that said Ukraine and Georgia would become part of NATO. The Russians made it unequivocally clear at the time that they viewed this as an existential threat, and they drew a line in the sand. Nevertheless, what has happened with the passage of time is that we have moved forward to include Ukraine in the West to make Ukraine a Western bulwark on Russia’s border... NATO expansion is the heart of the strategy, but it includes E.U. expansion as well, and it includes turning Ukraine into a pro-American liberal democracy, and, from a Russian perspective, this is an existential threat." Mearsheimer says Ukraine's political leeway is determined by how it manages to strike a balance between Western orientation and consideration for Russian security interests. Mearsheimer does not deny Russia's aggression in this regard, but his criticism is directed at EU and NATO. "Given the West's talk about eventual NATO membership and association agreements with the EU, how were politicians in Ukraine to resist the appeal of eventual inclusion? But if they succumb to that temptation they put themselves at risk of Russia’s wrath."

In a subsequent interview in November 2022 with the same New Yorker journalist, Mearsheimer argued that since the beginning of the conflict Russia has not been interested in the occupation of Ukraine, but only in the annexation of its south-eastern territories (the oblasts of Kherson, Zaporizhzhia, Luhansk, and Donetsk). The main proof of this would be the fact that if Putin had really intended to occupy the entire territory of Ukraine, he would not have used an army consisting of only 190,000 soldiers. The bombings on Kyiv had and have the sole purpose of inducing the Ukrainian government and its western allies to accept the recognition of the annexation to Russia of the four aforementioned territories.

In an interview with C-SPAN in late March 2022, Mearsheimer has stated that he considers American involvement with the 2022 Russian invasion of Ukraine to be secondary in terms of geopolitical priorities to immediate concerns which he associates with the containment of threats to geopolitical stability being caused by contemporary Chinese geopolitics, which Mearsheimer considers as a more immediate threat to geopolitical concerns in the United States. Mearsheimer debated the Russian invasion with Polish MP Radoslaw Sikorski in May 2022. Sikorski identified Putin as the culprit in conducting the invasion of Ukraine while Mearsheimer argued that Putin is pursuing a realist geopolitical plan to secure Russian national interests in the presence of perceived threats from an expanding NATO.

Hypothesis testing in international relations 
In 2013, Mearsheimer and Walt published "Leaving theory behind: Why simplistic hypothesis testing is bad for International Relations." They point out that in recent years, scholars of international relations have devoted less effort to creating and refining theories or using them to guide empirical research. Instead is a focus on what they call a simplistic hypothesis testing, which emphasizes discovering well-verified empirical regularities. They state that to be a mistake because insufficient attention to theory leads to misspecified empirical models or misleading measures of key concepts. They also point out that because of the poor quality data in international relations, it is less likely that the efforts will produce cumulative knowledge. It will lead to only a short-term gain and will make scholarship less useful to concerned citizens and policymakers.

Theories give a scholar an overarching framework of the myriad realms of activity. Theories are like maps and aim to simplify a complex reality, but unlike maps, theories provide a causal story by saying that one or more factors can explain a particular phenomenon. Theories attempt to simplify assumptions about the most relevant factors in the aim to explain how the world works. Some grand theories like realism or liberalism claim to explain broad patterns of state behavior, and middle-range theories focus on more narrowly defined phenomena like coercion, deterrence, and economic sanctions.

They list eight reasons why theories are important. The problems that arise from inadequate attention to theory is that it is impossible to construct good models or interpret statistical findings correctly. By privileging hypothesis testing, that is overlooked. It might make sense to pay more attention to hypothesis testing if it produced much useful knowledge about international relations, but Mearsheimer and Walt claim that this is not the case and that the simplistic hypothesis test is inherently flawed. Selection bias is also a problem that arise from inadequate attention to theory. To examine that more clearly, the authors point out James Fearson's critique of Paul Huth and Bruce Russett's analyses of extended deterrence. Mearsheimer and Walt also point out that contemporary international relations scholarship faces challenging measurement issues because of inadequate attention to theory and cause misleading measures. A few examples are given to support their claim, including Dan Reiter and Allan Stam's Democracies at War.

Mearsheimer and Walt state that it is a sophisticated study but contains questionable measures of key concepts and that the measures to test their idea do not capture the theories' core concepts. Poor data, the absence of explanation, and the lack of cumulation are other problems, arising from inadequate attention to theory and focusing too much on simplistic hypothesis testing.

Personal politics
In 2019, Mearsheimer said his preferred candidate in the 2020 Democratic presidential primary was Bernie Sanders. He has said that economic inequality in the United States was the greatest problem faced by the nation.

Selected works

Articles
 "Why the Ukraine Crisis Is the West's Fault: The Liberal Delusions That Provoked Putin." Foreign Affairs, vol. 93, no. 5 (Sep.-Oct. 2014), pp. 77–89. .

Books
 
 
 The Tragedy of Great Power Politics. W.W. Norton & Company. 2001. . .
 The Israel Lobby and U.S. Foreign Policy. Farrar, Straus and Giroux. 2007. . .
 Why Leaders Lie: The Truth About Lying in International Politics. Oxford University Press. 2011. . .

See also
 Great power
 Power (international relations)
 Power projection
 Realism (international relations)

References

External links

 
 
 

1947 births
Living people
20th-century American male writers
20th-century American non-fiction writers
21st-century American male writers
21st-century American non-fiction writers
American male non-fiction writers
American political scientists
Cornell University alumni
Geopoliticians
Harvard Fellows
American international relations scholars
Non-interventionism
People from Croton-on-Hudson, New York
Political realists
United States Air Force officers
United States Military Academy alumni
University of Chicago faculty
USC School of International Relations alumni